Robert Julian Apter (born 23 April 2003) is a Scottish professional footballer who plays as a midfielder for Blackpool. He has represented Scotland at under-19 level.

Club career

Blackpool
Born in Liverpool, Apter signed for Tranmere Rovers academy at the age of 8 and remained until he was released at  16. Apter secured a two-year scholarship at Blackpool in May 2019 and signed a two-year professional contract with the option of an additional year in November 2020. He made his senior debut later that month as a substitute in a 3–0 EFL Trophy win Leeds United U21. Apter made his league debut on 26 January 2021 as a late substitute in a 5–0 win away to Wigan Athletic and provided the assist for their final goal. In February 2021, he was one of 33 players awarded with the League Football Education's The 11 award for under-18 players.

Apter signed a new two-and-a-half-year contract with the club on 3 December 2021, with an option of a further year.

Bamber Bridge (loan)
On 13 August 2021, Apter joined Bamber Bridge on loan. As of 2 December, he had scored ten goals in all competitions. He returned to his parent club on 15 December.

Chester (loan)
On 3 January 2022, Apter joined Chester on an initial 28-day loan. On 1 February, it was extended until the end of the season.

Scunthorpe United (loan)
On 28 August 2022, Apter joined National League club Scunthorpe United on a short-term loan until January 2023. He made his debut the following day in a 2–0 home defeat to FC Halifax Town.

International career
In September 2021, Apter was called up to the Scotland under-19s.

He made his debut for the under-19s on 10 November 2021 against Armenia. He scored his first goal for them three days later in a 3–0 victory over Gibraltar.

Career statistics

References

External links
 

2003 births
Living people
Scottish footballers
Footballers from Liverpool
Association football midfielders
Blackpool F.C. players
Bamber Bridge F.C. players
Chester F.C. players
Scunthorpe United F.C. players
English Football League players
Northern Premier League players
National League (English football) players
Scotland youth international footballers